Angiomyxoma is a myxoid tumor involving the blood vessels.

It can affect the vulva and other parts of the pelvis. The characteristic feature of this tumor is its frequent local recurrence and it is currently regarded as a non-metastasizing benign tumor.

Genetics 
 HMGA2 rearrangement
 by translocation t(12;21)(q15;q21.1) 
 by translocation t(11;12)(q23;q15)
 by translocation t(8;12)(p12;q15)
 t(5;8)(p15;q22)

Pathology

Microscopy 
 Vascular appearance of tumor
 Hypocellular mesenchymal lesion
 Spindled and stellate cells with an ill-defined cytoplasm
 Cells loosely scattered in a myxoid stroma
 No evidence of nuclear atypia and mitosis
 Numerous, thin-to-thick wall vessels of different sizes
 Myxoid, hypocellular background
 Bland cytological appearance of spindle cells

Microscopical views

Immunochemistry 
Immunohistochemical studies show strong staining for desmin, estrogen receptors, and progesterone receptors. Staining for actin, CD34 and smooth muscle actin are  intermediate. Staining for S-100 protein is negative.

Diagnosis

Differential diagnosis 
 Myxoid tumors
 Angiomyofibroblastoma

Treatment

Prognosis 
Although it is a benign tumour and does not invade neighbouring tissues, it has a tendency to recur after surgical excision so it is termed  "aggressive". Recurrence can occur as early as six months from initial resection. Patients frequently present at tertiary medical centers with a history of labial mass (sometimes misdiagnosed as Gartner's cyst), with multiple surgical excisions from several surgeons. There is no standard medical therapy; agents reported to be effective in case reports include systemic hormonal therapy with SERMs such as tamoxifen or LHRH agonists (leuprolide), and cytotoxic ("traditional") chemotherapy, as well as radiation therapy especially for recurrent disease.

History 
Aggressive angiomyxoma was originally described in 1983, but the term "angiomyxoma" dates back to at least 1952.

See also
 Myxoma
 Cutaneous myxoma (Superficial angiomyxoma)

References

External links 

Vascular diseases
Benign neoplasms